Susan Littenberg (born 1967) is an American film editor.

Littenberg graduated from Ocean Township High School in 1985 in before receiving a Bachelor of Arts in Liberal Arts from the University of Delaware in 1990. Littenberg began her career as an assistant editor working with filmmakers such as Jim Jarmusch, Hal Hartley and Ang Lee.  She began her feature editing career as the lead editor of Steven Soderbergh's Gray's Anatomy.  She was the editor of films such as Tadpole, 13 Going on 30, A Lot Like Love, Charlotte's Web, Bride Wars, and Easy A.  Littenberg was nominated for Best Edited Feature Film – Comedy or Musical for Easy A at the 2010 American Cinema Editors Awards.  She teaches at UCLA, has taught at AFI, The Edit Center in New York City, the Main International Film Workshops and the City College of New York.

Filmography

References

External links

University of Delaware alumni
American film editors
Living people
Ocean Township High School alumni
People from Monmouth County, New Jersey
1967 births